Eve van Grafhorst (17 July 1982 – 20 November 1993) was one of the first Australian children to be infected with HIV via a blood transfusion. She became the centre of a controversy in 1985 when she was banned from her local pre-school amid fears she might infect other children.

Van Grafhorst was born prematurely in 1982, and required eleven blood transfusions to save her life. One of the transfusions was contaminated, and she contracted HIV.

In February 1985, her parents enrolled her in a pre-school in Kincumber, New South Wales. When she bit another child, the state medical officer for New South Wales said van Grafhorst should be barred from daycare until she was older. After her condition became known, parents of other preschoolers threatened to withdraw their children if she was re-enrolled, saying that the young girl posed a grave threat of infection. She was eventually permitted to attend school, provided she wore a plastic face mask at all times. Some parents felt that was insufficient, and that the van Grafhorsts should leave town.

The van Grafhorsts did leave, moving to Hastings, New Zealand, in 1986. In contrast to their Australian experience, the van Grafhorst family was welcomed in Hastings. Eve lived a relatively normal life, and attended a local school without incident.

In 1992, she received a Variety Gold Heart Award. Her story had been widely reported throughout the world and, on her tenth birthday, Eve, dressed as a radiant bride, was sent a letter and autographed photograph of Diana, Princess of Wales. After Eve died at home in 1993, aged 11, her mother, Gloria, received a sympathetic letter from Diana, praising Eve for her "courage and strength".

The 1994 TV documentary All About Eve (in reference to the 1950 film), produced by Vincent Burke and directed by Monique Oomen, is a biography of Eve.

See also
HIV/AIDS in New Zealand
HIV/AIDS in Australia

References

External links
Schools AIDS day - AIDS awareness event focusing on van Grafhorst's battles
Eve van Grafhorst was diagnosed with HIV and hounded out of Australia, but her legacy endures, ABC, 18-Nov-2018

1982 births
1993 deaths
New Zealand children
People from New South Wales
AIDS-related deaths in New Zealand
Australian children
Australian emigrants to New Zealand
Australian people of Dutch descent
New Zealand people of Dutch descent
Child deaths